The Carlsberg 1997 ICC Trophy was a cricket tournament played in Kuala Lumpur, Malaysia between 24 March and 13 April 1997. It was the Cricket World Cup qualification tournament for the 1999 Cricket World Cup.

Bangladesh were the winners of the tournament, defeating Kenya in the final, while Scotland won the third place play-off. These three teams took the three available spots in the World Cup, Bangladesh and Scotland both qualifying for this tournament for the first time. 

With some World Cup matches scheduled in Scotland and the Netherlands, Scotland would become the first Associate nation to play a home fixture in a World Cup. The Netherlands failed to qualify but World Cup matches were still held in the Netherlands.

Squads

First round

The first round took the form of a group stage, with four groups, two of six teams and two of five teams. The top two teams from each group went through to the second round, whilst the remaining 14 teams took part in play-offs for the final standings.

Points tables

Position of teams in the table is determined by:
1. Total points
2. Head-to-head result (if more than two teams level, head-to-head only applies if all those teams have played the same number of matches against each other)
3. Net run rate

Second round

The second round was also a group stage, this time with two groups of four. The top two teams went through to the semi final stage, whilst the third placed teams played off for fifth place, and the fourth placed teams played off for 7th place.

Group E matches

Group F matches

Points tables

Plate championship & play-offs

14 Teams placed below second position from first round groups contested for the plate championship and play-offs. Champion team was awarded Philip Snow Plate named after legendary Fijian cricketer Philip Snow.

17th place play-off semi finals

13th place play-off semi finals

Plate semi finals

19th place play-off

17th place play-off

15th place play-off

13th place play-off

11th place play-off

Plate final

Finals & play-offs

7th place play-off

5th place play-off

Semi finals

The first semi final between Ireland and Kenya was won by Kenya by just seven runs. Maurice Odumbe won the man of the match award for his 67 in Kenya's innings. The second semi final was won by Bangladesh who beat Scotland by 72 runs.

3rd place play-off

In the 3rd place play off, Scotland batted first, and scored 187 in 45 overs after rain delayed the start. Mike Smith top scored for Scotland with 49. The Duckworth-Lewis method set Ireland's target at 192 runs, but the Irish were bowled out for 141, Keith Sheridan taking 4/34 with his left arm spin. Scotland thus qualified for the 1999 World Cup.

Final

The final between Kenya and Bangladesh was also affected by rain and was played over two days. Kenya batted first and scored 241/8 from their 50 overs, Steve Tikolo top scoring with 147. The Bangladesh target was set at 166 from 25 overs by the Duckworth–Lewis method, a target they reached with the last ball of the match. They were not able to defend their title, as they were elected to Test status in 2000. This would also be Kenya's last appearance in the ICC Trophy being allocated ODI status in 2000, though they returned in the successor tournament, the ICC World Cup Qualifier in 2009.

Statistics

Most runs
The top five run scorers (total runs) are included in this table.

Source: CricketArchive

Most wickets

The top five wicket takers are listed in this table, listed by wickets taken and then by bowling average.

Source: CricketArchive

Final standings

See also

ICC Trophy
1999 Cricket World Cup

References

External links
 1997 ICC Trophy Official Site

Icc Trophy, 1997
ICC World Cup Qualifier
ICC
International cricket competitions in Malaysia